"The Profit of Doom" is a single by doom metal band Type O Negative from the 2007 album Dead Again. The single version of the song is 4½ minutes long, but lasts nearly eleven minutes on the album. The single was released just before the album was released in February 2007. A music video was released for the song.

The song begins with slow, heavy riffs, with a chorus in the style of King Crimson before some additional doom metal riffs, and ending with a doom metal solo. The lyrics refer to the asteroid 99942 Apophis; which, at that time, was said to have a possibility of hitting the Earth on Friday, April 13, 2029.

Personnel 

Peter Steele - lead vocals, bass
Kenny Hickey - backing vocals, guitars
Josh Silver - backing vocals, keyboards, sound effects 
Johnny Kelly - drums

References

External links 
 Type O Negative - "The Profit of Doom" (single) on YouTube
 Type O Negative - The Profit of Doom (album version) on YouTube

Type O Negative songs
2007 singles
P
2007 songs